The standing high jump is an athletics event that was featured in the Olympics from 1900 to 1912. It is performed in the same way as high jump, with the difference being that the athlete has no run-up and must stand still and jump with both feet together.

Ray Ewry was the best of the Olympic era, setting world records for the standing high jump (1.65 m on July 16, 1900). He was also highly successful in the standing long jump and the standing triple jump.

The event previously enjoyed wide competition, featuring on the Olympics athletics programme from 1900 to 1912, as well as at the 1922 and 1926 Women's World Games. The event was contested at the Amateur Athletic Union championships in the United States as an indoor event around the turn of the 20th century. Its popularity waned in the 20th century, although it maintained championship status for a longer period of time in Scandinavian countries.

One of the best results ever is 1.90 m by Swedish athlete Rune Almén in 1980 which at the time was a Swedish record and an unofficial world record. Later he also jumped 1.90 m, which today is the world record. The Norwegian record is 1.82 by Sturle Kalstad in 1983.

Olympic medalists

Intercalated Games

References

External links
 Youtube video of a 1.80 standing high jump



 
Events in track and field
High jump
Discontinued Summer Olympic disciplines in athletics